William Magee Wynkoop (January 26, 1916 – May 24, 2003) and Percy Roy Strickland (April 30, 1918 – July 28, 2003) were a longtime gay couple active with Services & Advocacy for GLBT Elders (SAGE), an organization for improving the lives of LGBT older adults.

Early life
Wynkoop was born in Manasquan, New Jersey, Strickland in Huntington, New York.

In 1938 Strickland, after graduating from high school, went to work at a beach club in Huntington. When his family understood he was gay, they subjected him to a male hormones cure to make him "normal". From 1941 to 1945 he worked at Grunman Aircraft. After World War II he moved to New York City and got a job at R. H. Macy in display, and later moved to McCreery's and Lord & Taylor.

Wynkoop graduated from Dartmouth College. After serving in Europe as an Army medic during World War II, Wynkoop attended Columbia University and obtained a master's in English.

Career
Wynkoop at first taught at Wayne State, Detroit, and Strickland took a job in Cleveland, Ohio, so that they could meet on the weekends. Later they were back in New York City, when Wynkoop taught first at Adelphi University and then at Rutgers University. Wynkoop retired in 1979.

Strickland was the manager of a florist shop on the Upper East Side, Manhattan, catering to celebrities and well-to-do people. Strickland retired in 1998.

Activism
In 1952 Wynkoop and Strickland accompanied Edward Sagarin, the author of the 1951 book The Homosexual in America: A Subjective Approach to a meeting of the Veterans Benevolent Association, one of the first gay groups in New York City, founded in 1945.

Wynkoop and Strickland were active in many gay organizations, especially SAGE; they also spoke to young gay men at the Hetrick-Martin Institute, Green Chimneys, Cornell University, and conventions.

Already back in 1988, Wynkoop and Strickland were giving interviews as a longterm, "married", couple.

In May 1996 Wynkoop was feature in an article on PlanSponsor Magazine Portrait of a Retiree: William Magee Wynkoop; the article focused on Wynkoop's 46 year relationship with Strickland, highlighting the fact that Wynkoop "will not be able to leave any benefits to his life partner".

On June 16, 1996, Wynkoop and Strickland participated to the "Great Wed-In" in Bryant Park when Tom Duane, an openly gay councilman married many gay couples. On the stage with them there were also a woman rabbi, Beth-Simchat Torah, Reverend Pat Baumgardner, the pastor of the gay Metropolitan Church in New York, and Dr. Robert Williams, the pastor at the Marble Collegiate church. The day after, on June 17, they were married again by Dr. Williams at the Marble Collegiate Church on Fifth Avenue.

Until 1998 Strickland volunteered in the flower program at the Memorial Sloan Kettering Cancer Center and at the Associated Blind on West 23rd Street.

Personal life
Wynkoop and Strickland met by chance on December 19, 1949, in Washington Square Park, Greenwich Village.

On March 3, 1993, Wynkoop and Strickland registered their "domestic partnership".

"We have a full life," said Wynkoop. "I could not imagine my life without him," said Strickland. "Neither could I," said Wynkoop. They both died in 2003, 2 months apart, William 87 and Roy 85, after living together for more than 53 years. They are buried together at Greenwood Cemetery, Brielle, New Jersey.

Legacy
William Wynkoop and Roy Strickland are featured in Longtime Companions: Autobiographies of Gay Male Fidelity published in 1999.

References

American people of Dutch descent
Gay men